Stanley Frank "Packy" Rogers, born Hazinski (April 26, 1913 – May 15, 1998), was an American professional baseball player, manager and scout. An infielder, he appeared in 23 games for the  Brooklyn Dodgers. He attended Fordham University.

Rogers' professional career began in 1936 included all or parts of 14 seasons as an active player. During his 23-game stint with Brooklyn, he collected seven hits, with three of them coming in his MLB debut on July 12, 1938, against the New York Giants at Ebbets Field. Rogers, the Dodgers' starting third baseman that day, hit two singles and a triple with three runs batted in, collected a base on balls, and scored a run, as Brooklyn defeated its arch-rivals, 13–5.

Rogers served in the United States Navy in the Pacific during World War II, then managed in the low levels of the minor leagues from 1947–59. He also scouted for the Minnesota Twins, beginning in 1960 when the franchise was still the Washington Senators. He died in Elmira, New York, at age 85.

References

External links

1913 births
1998 deaths
United States Navy personnel of World War II
Baseball players from Pennsylvania
Brooklyn Dodgers players
Buffalo Bisons (minor league) players
Cedar Rapids Rockets players
Elmira Colonels players
Elmira Pioneers players
Farnham Pirates players
Fordham Rams baseball players
Gloversville-Johnstown Glovers players
Indianapolis Indians players
Major League Baseball infielders
Milwaukee Brewers (minor league) players
Minnesota Twins scouts
Minor league baseball managers
Nashville Vols players
New Orleans Pelicans (baseball) players
People from Swoyersville, Pennsylvania
Portland Beavers players
Washington Senators (1901–60) scouts